Torchino is a rural locality (a selo) in Seletskoye Rural Settlement, Suzdalsky District, Vladimir Oblast, Russia. The population was 551 as of 2010. There are 8 streets.

Geography 
Torchino is located 19 km northeast of Suzdal (the district's administrative centre) by road. Teterino is the nearest rural locality.

References 

Rural localities in Suzdalsky District
Suzdalsky Uyezd